Christopher Baker may refer to:

Christopher W. Baker (born 1956), British landscape artist
Christopher Paul Baker (born 1955), English travel writer and photographer
Christopher James Baker, actor
Christopher Baker (Manitoba politician)

See also
Chris Baker (disambiguation)
Christopher Barker (disambiguation)